Ekaterina Makarova and Elena Vesnina were the defending champions, but chose not to participate this year.

Hsieh Su-wei and Barbora Strýcová won the title, defeating Gabriela Dabrowski and Xu Yifan in the final, 6–3, 6–1.

Seeds
The top four seeds received a bye into the second round.

Draw

Finals

Top half

Bottom half

References
 Main Draw

Women's Doubles